Harrison Lynn Rosdahl (August 24, 1941 – June 15, 2004) was an American football defensive lineman who played three seasons in the American Football League with the Buffalo Bills and Kansas City Chiefs. He was drafted by the San Diego Chargers in the fourteenth round of the 1963 AFL Draft. He was also drafted by the San Francisco 49ers in the fourth round of the 1963 NFL Draft. Rosdahl played college football at Penn State University and attended Ridgefield Park High School in Ridgefield Park, New Jersey. He was a member of the Kansas City Chiefs team that won the 1966 AFL championship.

Rosdahl died at the age of 62 on June 15, 2004, of a fall suffered at his home in Ridgefield Park.

References

External links
Just Sports Stats
Fanbase profile

1941 births
2004 deaths
American football defensive linemen
Buffalo Bills players
Accidental deaths from falls
Accidental deaths in New Jersey
Kansas City Chiefs players
Penn State Nittany Lions football players
Sportspeople from Hackensack, New Jersey
People from Ridgefield Park, New Jersey
Players of American football from New Jersey
Ridgefield Park High School alumni